Draper Town Center station is a light rail station located in Draper, Utah, United States, served by the TRAX Blue Line of the Utah Transit Authority's (UTA) TRAX system. The Blue Line provides service north from this station to Downtown Salt Lake City.

Description
The station is located at 1131 East Pioneer Road (12400 South). The station was built in the historic center of Draper between 12300 South and 12400 South next to Draper's city hall, the Draper Poultrymen and Egg Producers' Plant (now operated as Intermountain Farmers Association [IFA]), and Draper City Park. 

It is situated in an area where the railroad right-of-way on which the TRAX line is built turns east-southeast at the base of a retail-covered hill to the northeast; the right-of-way (proposed for use in Phase 2 of the Draper Extension, and already incorporating a rails-with-trails multi-use path) continues east, then south and west in a curve following the contours of the land in order to gain elevation on its approach to the Point of the Mountain pass and enter Utah County. The Draper Branch of the Salt Lake County Library is located just south of the station (off 1130 East). Immediately south of the passenger platform (on the north side of East Pioneer Road) is an exhibit that includes an historic rail car and the history of Draper, particularly the history of egg production in the area.

The station has a park and ride lot to the north of the passenger platform which is accessible from East Draper Parkway (from 700 East, 1000 East, 1300 East, and I-15). Due to the slope of the hillside on which it is built, the Park and Ride lot is terraced, with the Draper Canal running between sections of the lot. The station is scheduled to open August 18, 2013 as part of the Draper extension of the Blue Line and is operated by Utah Transit Authority.

Future plans
While the Draper Town Center station is the terminus of Phase 1 of the Draper Draper extension, in Phase 2 of the Draper extension UTA plans two more stations further south along the railway right of way. The planned stations will be along Highland Drive and at about 146000 South. UTA has not provided any specific date by which work Phase 2 of the extension will begin.

References

TRAX (light rail) stations
Railway stations in the United States opened in 2013
Railway stations in Salt Lake County, Utah
2013 establishments in Utah